Yearling may refer to:

Yearling (horse), a horse between one and two years old
The Yearling, a 1938 novel by Marjorie Kinnan Rawlings
The Yearling (film), 1946 film based on the novel
The Yearling (1994 film), TV movie that aired on CBS